Nordea Bank Norge is the Norwegian branch of Nordea Bank Abp, the Norwegian retail part of the Nordea financial group. The Norwegian headquarters is in Essendrops gate 7, Oslo.

History
In 2000 MeritaNordbanken purchased Christiania Bank from the Norwegian Government with its subsidiaries. All the divisions was thereafter re-branded as Nordea. Through Christiania Bank the bank has a legacy which goes back to 1848 in Norway.

In January 2017 Nordea converted Nordea Bank Norge ASA into a branch of the Swedish holding company Nordea AB.

References

Banks of Norway
Companies based in Oslo
Banks established in 2000